Love's So Tough is a studio album by the Iron City Houserockers. Released in 1979, the Iron City Houserocker's first album attempts to capture the presence of what was essentially a Pittsburgh bar band playing to a blue collar crowd every night.  While Joe Grushecky's songwriting skills are clearly still developing, his potential is visible in cuts such as "Dance With Me" and "Heroes Are Hard to Find".  The general sound of the album is reminiscent of a slightly "harder" Bruce Springsteen, and the heavy use of harmonica would be a distinguishing factor of the Houserockers for several albums to come.

Background
In the spring of 1977 Joe Grushecky's brother Jon sent him a full page advertisement from Billboard, about the release of a Ronnie Spector record on Cleveland International Records.  The band was known at that time as the Brick Alley Band, and they sent a demo tape to Steve Popovich at Cleveland International Records.  After a personal phone call from Steve Popovich, Joe Grushecky and his band drove out to Cleveland and under the guidance of Steve Popovich and Marty Mooney, made a series of recordings that landed a deal with MCA Records.

The song "Blondie" was originally recorded during the Love's So Tough sessions and issued as the B-side to the "Hideaway" single.  The song would go on to be completely re-written with the help of Steve Van Zandt and re-recorded during the Have a Good Time... But Get Out Alive sessions and issued on that album in 1980.

The Chuck Berry song "School Days (Ring! Ring! Goes the Bell)" was also recorded for the album but was cut from the final release. The track was then released on Pumping Iron & Sweating Steel: The Best of the Iron City Houserockers.

A promotional-only picture disc LP containing an exclusive pre-release mix of the album as well as the track "Blondie" was released early to attendees of the 1979 NARM National Convention in North Canton, Ohio.

The album was reissued in CD format in 1999 by Rock Heritage, and again in 2019 in remastered digital format by Cleveland International Records for its 40th anniversary.

Track listing

Side one
"I Can't Take It" (Joe Grushecky) – 3:54
"Hideaway" (Fred Goodman) – 4:31
"Turn It Up" (Grushecky) – 4:54
"Dance with Me" (Grushecky, Art Nardini) – 4:46

Side two
"Love So Tough" (Grushecky, Gil Snyder) – 3:42
"Veronica" (Grushecky) – 3:38
"Heroes Are Hard to Find" (Grushecky, Nardini, Gary Scalese) – 2:55
"Stay with Me Tonight" (Grushecky) – 4:43
"I'm Lucky" (Grushecky, Nardini) – 4:27

Personnel
Iron City Houserockers
Joe Grushecky - lead vocals, guitar
Gary Scalese - guitar
Art Nardini - bass guitar
Gil Snyder - keyboards
Ned E. Rankin - drums
Marc Reisman - harmonica
with:
Billy Cross - slide guitar on "Turn It Up", guitar on "Hideaway" and "Stay with Me Tonight"
Denny Martin - accordion on "Stay with Me Tonight"
Richard Reising - background vocals on "Dance with Me" and "Hideaway"
Susan Lynch - background vocals on "Dance with Me" and "Hideaway"
Rodney Psyka - background vocals on "Dance with Me" and "Hideaway"
Tampa Lann - background vocals on "I'm Lucky"

"Turn It Up" was recorded at Asterick Recording, Pittsburgh, Pennsylvania.

Chart performance

References

External links 
 Joe Grushecky's official web site
 Rock's So Tough - Iron City Houserockers

1979 debut albums
Iron City Houserockers albums
MCA Records albums